Rabba Mainu Maaf Karin is a 2020 Pakistani romantic drama television series co-produced by Momina Duraid and Moomal Shunaid under their production banners MD Productions and Moomal Entertainment. It features Hina Altaf, Jinaan Hussain and Hammad Farooqui in leads.

Cast 
 Hina Altaf as Zoya
 Hammad Farooqui as Fateh
 Jinaan Hussain as Zeenia (Zeeni)
 Tipu Sharif as Jawad
 Beenish Raja as Sonia
 Saad Azhar as Arsalan
 Kauser Siddiqui as Zoya's mother

Soundtrack

The original soundtrack is composed by Naveed Nashad, with lyrics from Aehsun Talish sung by Naveed Nashad and Sanam Marvi.

References

External links
 Official website

2020 Pakistani television series debuts
2020 Pakistani television series endings
Urdu-language television shows
Pakistani drama television series
Hum TV original programming